George Latimer Bates (March 21, 1863, Abingdon, Illinois US  – January 31, 1940 Chelmsford UK), LL.D., M.B.O.U. was an American naturalist.

Bates studied at Knox College, Galesburg and at the Chicago Theological Seminary and in 1895 visited West Africa and lived in the south east Cameroon, making a living by farming. He collected natural history specimens in his travels and sent many of these to the Natural History Museum in London.

In 1928 Bates moved to England and wrote a Handbook on the Birds of West Africa (1930). He learned Arabic and visited Arabia in 1934 and studied the ornithology of Arabia. He was unable to publish the work but wrote several papers on Arabian birds for the Ibis. His unpublished manuscript on the Birds of Arabia was later used by Richard Meinertzhagen.

Legacy
A species of African snake, Rhamnophis batesii, is named in his honor, as are three species of African amphibians (Astylosternus batesi, Phrynobatrachus batesii, and Nectophryne batesii), twenty birds, and four mammals.

References

Sources
Obituary. Ibis 1940: 343–348.
Warr FE (1996). Manuscripts and Drawings in the ornithology and Rotschild libraries of The Natural History Museum at Tring. BOC.

American ornithologists
1863 births
1940 deaths
People from Abingdon, Illinois